Zachariah Simukonda (born 27 June 1983) is a Zambian football striker who is currently a free agent.

In December 2011, Zachariah signed for the Malaysian team, PBDKT T-Team FC in a 1-year contract alongside Bosnian international, Bojan Petrić. However, Zachariah picked up a long term injury during a league match and T-Team had to terminate his contract. Before his injury, Zachariah manage to score 1 goal in 5 league games.

Zachariah previously played for Red Arrows FC in 2010 and also played with Perlis FA in Malaysia in 2005/07.

References

External links
 
 
 

Zambian expatriates in Malaysia
Expatriate footballers in Malaysia
1983 births
Living people
Expatriate footballers in Syria
Zambian footballers
Perlis FA players
Al-Merrikh SC players
Al-Faisaly SC players
Expatriate footballers in Jordan
Red Arrows F.C. players
Association football forwards
Syrian Premier League players
Zambia international footballers